Broken Creek is a creek in northern Victoria, Australia. The creek diverges from Broken River immediately downstream from the former Lake Mokoan (now decommissioned) near Benalla and flows in a north-west direction. The creek passes through the towns of Numurkah and Nathalia before entering the Murray River upstream from Barmah.

References

Goulburn Broken catchment
Rivers of Hume (region)
Tributaries of the Murray River